Gerald Joseph Heffernan (July 24, 1916 – January 16, 2007) was a professional ice hockey player who played for the Montreal Canadiens in the National Hockey League.  Heffernan played 83 games for the Canadiens, recording 33 goals and 35 assists for a career total of 68 points.  He won the Stanley Cup in 1944.  After retiring from hockey Gerald Heffernan became an insurance salesman and lived the rest of his years in Moraga, California.

His son, Terence Heffernan, was a noted Canadian screenwriter.

External links

Gerald Heffernan's Obituary

1916 births
2007 deaths
Canadian ice hockey right wingers
Ice hockey people from Montreal
Montreal Canadiens players
Stanley Cup champions
People from Moraga, California